This is a list of games for the Atari Video Computer System, a console renamed to the Atari 2600 in November 1982. Sears licensed the console and many games from Atari, Inc., selling them under different names. 3 cartridges were Sears exclusives.

The list contains 
games, divided into three sections:

Games published by Atari and Sears
Games published by third parties
Hobbyist-developed games after the system was discontinued.

The Atari VCS was first released in North America on September 11, 1977 with nine cartridges: Air-Sea Battle, Basic Math, Blackjack, Combat, Indy 500, Star Ship, Street Racer, Surround and Video Olympics.

The final licensed Atari 2600 games released in North America were Ikari Warriors, MotoRodeo, Sentinel, and Xenophobe in early 1991, and the final licensed games released in Europe were Klax and Acid Drop in 1990 and 1992 respectively.

Games published by Atari and Sears 
All  of the initial era of Atari 2600 games were developed and manufactured by Atari, Inc. These games were published by Atari, and many were also licensed to Sears, which released these games under its Tele-Games brand, often with different titles. Sears's Tele-Games brand was unrelated to the company Telegames, which also produced cartridges for the Atari 2600 (mostly re-issues of M Network games.)

Three games were also produced by Atari Inc. for Sears as exclusive releases under the Tele-Games brand: Steeplechase, Stellar Track, and Submarine Commander.

Games published by third parties 
As the Atari 2600 console grew in popularity, in 1980 other game developers, such as Activision and Imagic, entered the market and published more than 380 of their own cartridges for the Atari 2600. Many of the most popular Atari 2600 games, such as Pitfall! and Demon Attack, are third-party games.

Homebrew games

The Atari 2600 has been a popular platform for homebrew projects, with  games publicly released. Unlike later systems, the Atari 2600 does not require a modchip to run cartridges. Many games are clones of existing games written as programming challenges, often borrowing the name of the original.

In 2003, Activision selected several games for inclusion in the Game Boy Advance version of their Activision Anthology, as indicated below.

Additional titles (publisher unknown)

Included with Atari Flashback 9 / Flashback 9 Gold
 Adventure II
 Aquaventure
 Asteroids Deluxe
 Atari Climber
 Burnin’ Rubber 
 Championship Soccer
 Chase It!
 Combat Two
 Decathlon
 Escape It!
 Fun with Numbers
 Miss It!
 RealSports Basketball
 Return to Haunted House
 Saboteur
 Save Mary
 Shield Shifter
 Space Raid
 Strip Off
 Tempest
 Wizard
 Yars’ Return

See also 
 List of Atari 2600 prototype games
 List of best-selling Atari 2600 video games
 Lists of video games
 List of GameLine games for the Atari 2600
 :Category:Cancelled Atari 2600 games

Notes

References

External links 
 Atari 2600 Rarity Guide
  - Dozens of games freely playable from within the web browser.

 *
Atari 2600